This page lists the supporting characters of Hawkeye with some of them being exclusive to the Ultimate Marvel reality.

Supporting characters
 Bangs – Weapons and explosives specialist of the W.C.A.
 Dominic Fortune – A soldier of fortune with a connection to Mockingbird's past.
 London – Researcher and developer of the W.C.A.
 Rover – A Bio-Com (Biological Combat Unit created by the Secret Empire) rescued by Hawkeye.
 Twitchy – Senior intelligence analyst of the W.C.A.
 Grills – A man who lives in Hawkeye's building and owns a rooftop grill on which he barbecues for his friends. He knows Clint Barton is Hawkeye, but insistently thinks the latter is "Hawkguy". Grills was later killed by the Tracksuit Mafia.
 Grills made his live-action debut in the 2021 Disney+ series Hawkeye, portrayed by Clayton English. This version is a firefighter and member of the NYC LARPers who had found the Ronin suit in Kate Bishop's apartment following the Tracksuit Mafia's attack. Grills thought it was just a ninja suit. Clint Barton had to duel him in the park to get it back. Grills and his fellow cosplayers later help Barton and Bishop in dealing with the Tracksuit Mafia.

Allies
 Avengers – Earth's mightiest heroes. Hawkeye's friends and teammates.
 Kate Bishop – Member of the Young Avengers and Clint's protégé/successor during his death.
 In the Marvel Cinematic Universe live-action series Hawkeye (2021), it is revealed Clint inadvertently saved Kate during the Battle of New York. From then, she becomes inspired by him and a super fan. When she meets him accidentally, she embarks on a mission with him to end the Ronin legacy. She is later taken in by him to live at his house.
 Mockingbird – Former S.H.I.E.L.D. agent. Hawkeye's ex-wife, former lover and frequent partner.
 Black Widow (Natasha Romanoff) – Former Russian spy who is Hawkeye's close friend and former occasional partner.
 Deadpool – Merc with a mouth and comic relief. Has fought with and against Hawkeye depending on the scenario, but has recently become a close friend. 
 Jorge Latham – Former employee of Cross Technological Enterprises and trusted friend of Hawkeye.
 Captain America (Steve Rogers) – Super-Soldier and Avenger. Hawkeye's friend and mentor.
 Sandman (Flint Marko)- Supervillain. Befriended Hawkeye during his attempt to reform.
 Jim Scully – Former superpowered adventurer and hired enforcer.
 Silver Sable – Symkarian mercenary and leader of the Wild Pack.
  – Born June 29th, Lucky is Hawkeye's dog, which he adopts in the first issue of his series by Matt Fraction. The dog's tag identified it by the name "Arrow", but Hawkeye chose to rename it "Lucky". Lucky gets an issue of the comic devoted to his point of view, in which it is revealed that he thinks of himself by the name of "Pizza-Dog". Lucky appears in a post-launch update of video game Marvel's Avengers.
 Lucky made his live-action debut in the 2021 Disney+ series Hawkeye, which is set in the Marvel Cinematic Universe (MCU). He is a golden retriever who was saved and adopted by Kate Bishop and accompanied her and Barton during their mission.

Family
 Barney Barton – Hawkeye's brother and former undercover FBI agent. Later became a costumed supervillain known as Trickshot, Hawkeye's archenemy.
 Edith Barton – Hawkeye's mother. Deceased.
 Harold Barton – Hawkeye's father. Deceased.
 Ben Morse – Mockingbird's brother and Hawkeye's former brother-in-law.<ref>Hawkeye & Mockingbird #6 (2010)</ref>
 Susan Morse – Mockingbird's mother and Hawkeye's former mother-in-law.

Family in other versions
 Laura Barton – The wife of Clint Barton in the Ultimate Marvel reality. Laura had long known Clint Barton and had married him sometime prior to The Ultimates 2. Together they had three kids: Callum Barton, Lewis Barton and baby Nicole Barton. Clint would call them before every mission in case he never came back. Laura and their three children were killed when a traitor (later revealed to be Black Widow) sold them out to a black-ops team.
 Laura Barton makes her live-action debut in the MCU films Avengers: Age of Ultron (2015) and Avengers: Endgame (2019), and the Disney+ series Hawkeye (2021), portrayed by Linda Cardellini. She has three children with her husband (Cooper Barton, Lila Barton, and Nathaniel Pietro Barton). 

 Laura is introduced in Avengers: Age of Ultron, in which she provides Steve Rogers, Tony Stark, Natasha Romanoff, Bruce Banner, and Thor sanctuary at her and Clint’s home. Later, she greets Clint when he returns home. 
 In Avengers: Endgame, Laura disintegrated due to the Snap, but five years later, is restored to life. She reunites with Clint at their home, and later attends Stark's funeral.
 In Hawkeye'', Laura regularly contacts Clint to check up on him while he's in New York, partially aware of his dealings with the Tracksuit Mafia, who Clint made enemies of while he was Ronin. It is revealed she was an agent of S.H.I.E.L.D., but has since retired.

Love interests
 Sheila Danning – Head of Public Relations at Cross Technological Enterprises. Betrayed Hawkeye to Crossfire.
 Eden – A tattooed lady and a member of the Keibler Circus, brief encounter.
 Barbara "Bobbi" Morse – also known as Mockingbird, Hawkeye met her shortly after his relationship with the Scarlet Witch, when they were both Avengers. After joining the Defenders they wed. Together they led the West Coast Avengers until Mephisto killed her. She later came back to life but was revealed to be a Skrull in disguise.
 Natasha Romanoff – Black Widow and Hawkeye cooperated to take down Stark industries, but when Black Widow's amnesia's effects vanished she became an Avenger. In order to impress her, Hawkeye turned to crime until he realized he wasn't impressing her and joined the Avengers as well. They formed a perfect duo and worked together on different occasions, this leading to them forming a relationship. But Iron Man was worried the relationship would compromise missions so he forced them to break off their romance. 
 Moonstone (Karla Sofen) – fellow Thunderbolt
 She-Hulk (Jennifer Walters) – The brash bowman and She-Hulk shared a short relationship, which She-Hulk broke off because of Hawkeye's personality.
 Scarlet Witch (Wanda Maximoff) – Hawkeye and the Scarlet Witch had a brief romance which angered the Vision, causing them to break it off.
 Wasp (Janet van Dyne) – After Wasp broke up with Hank Pym, she started a relationship with Hawkeye which ended when Thor killed her.

Employers
 Carson Carnival of Travelling Wonders – A traveling carnival where a young Hawkeye first met the Swordsman and Trick Shot.
 Cross Technological Enterprises – A technological research and development company where Hawkeye worked as chief of security.
 Keibler Circus – Formerly known as the Tiboldt Circus.
 World Counter-terrorism Agency – An anti-terrorist organization founded by Mockingbird.

Enemies
 A.I.M. – Advanced Idea Mechanics. International terrorist organization.
 Albino – A scientist specialising in mutagenics. Able to replicate superhuman abilities through technological means.
 Baron Zemo – The son of an elite Nazi scientist. Gifted intellect and master strategist. Skilled in various forms of combat.
 Batroc's Brigade – A team of mercenaries led by Batroc the Leaper.
 Blind Justice – A vigilante known to use lethal force.
 Bobcat – An acrobatic criminal and leader of the Claws.
 Bullet Biker – A former member of Carson Carnival of Travelling Wonders and stunt motorcyclist turned criminal.
 Claws – A team of acrobatic criminals. They are dressed exactly like their leader Bobcat as a tactic to confuse their enemies.
 Crossfire – A former CIA agent turned subversive supervillain and arms dealer. The closest thing Hawkeye has to an archenemy.
 Dark Ocean Society – A Japanese secret society of samurai warriors.
 Death-Throws – A team of juggling supervillains often hired by Crossfire.
 Death T.H.R.O.W.S. – Techno Hybrid Remotely Operated Weapons Systems. Crossfire's robotic army formerly known as Magnum Z's.
 Firefox – A cyborg assassin for the Russian government.
 Hood – Parker Robbins is a crime lord who rose to power via his magical cloak and pair of boots with supernatural abilities, such as teleportation and invisibility. He can also channel magic through his guns.
 Javelynn – A supervillain hired by the Secret Empire. Skilled javelin thrower and athlete.
  – An assassin hired by the Tracksuit Mafia to kill Barton and his friends at the apartment. He was responsible for making Barton deaf by putting two of his arrows into Barton's ears.
 Lotus Newmark – Criminal mastermind and skilled martial artist.
 Orb – A deformed motorcycling supervillain.
 Phantom Rider – Jaime Slade. Ancestor of the original Phantom Rider. Inherited gunslinger skills and ghostly appearance.
 Phantom Rider – Lincoln Slade. Brother of the original Phantom Rider, now a vengeful spirit.
 Monica Rappaccini – Supreme Scientist of A.I.M.
 Secret Empire – A subversive organization.
 Silencer – An assassin employed by Crossfire. Able to nullify sound.
 Alexei Shostakov – Former KGB agent and Red Guardian. Later became the new Ronin.
 Stone Perfs – A street gang employed by Lotus Newmark.
 Swordsman – Expert swordsman and athlete. Hawkeye's former mentor.
 Taskmaster – Mercenary for hire and henchmen instructor. Has the ability to replicate physical movement using "photographic reflexes".
 Terminizer – A vigilante with a murderous vendetta against the Stone Perfs. Revealed to be a pre-teen boy.
 Tracksuit Mafia – Dubbed the Tracksuit Draculas and the Tracksuit Bros., this is the tracksuit-wearing gang in Fraction's Hawkeye series who Barton continually runs into. They are responsible for the death of Grills.
 Trickshot – Buck Chisholm. Highly skilled archer. Hawkeye's former mentor.
 Viper – A master of espionage. Former leader of HYDRA and the Secret Empire.

References

External links
  Albino at the Appendix to the Handbook of the Marvel Universe
  Blind Justice at the Appendix to the Handbook of the Marvel Universe
  Bobcat at the Appendix to the Handbook of the Marvel Universe
 
  Carson Carnival of Travelling Wonders at the Appendix to the Handbook of the Marvel Universe
 Keibler Circus at the Appendix to the Handbook of the Marvel Universe
 Lotus Newmark at the Appendix to the Handbook of the Marvel Universe
  Silencer at the Appendix to the Handbook of the Marvel Universe
 Stone Perfs at the Appendix to the Handbook of the Marvel Universe
 Terminizer at the Appendix to the Handbook of the Marvel Universe

Hawkeye supporting characters, List of